The 2011 season was the Minnesota Vikings' 51st in the National Football League, and the first full season under head coach Leslie Frazier, who served as the team's interim head coach for the final six games of the 2010 season. The team failed to improve on their 6–10 record from 2010, going 2–6 before their bye week, before being eliminated from playoff contention in week 12 with a 2–9 record. The team also suffered its first six-game losing streak since the 1984 season.

The team started the season with a new starting quarterback, Donovan McNabb, who had enjoyed great success with the Eagles but had a subpar year with the Redskins in 2010. McNabb played respectably, having a passer rating of 82.9 and only turning the ball over twice, but his 1–5 record as starter led to him being benched in favor of rookie Christian Ponder in Week 6, and McNabb was later waived on December 1, 2011. Despite a poor year for the team as a whole, Jared Allen set a franchise record for most sacks in a season with 22. The team led the league in sacks with 50, but also tied a team record for fewest interceptions caught in a season with only eight.

Offseason

Draft

After finishing with a 6–10 record in the 2010 season, the Vikings were allocated the 12th pick in the 2011 NFL Draft.

 The Vikings traded their third-round selection (74th overall) to the New England Patriots in exchange for New England's 2012 seventh-round selection (223rd overall) and WR Randy Moss.
 The Vikings traded the fifth-round selection they acquired from the New York Giants (150th overall) to the Cleveland Browns in exchange for Cleveland's sixth-round selection and the sixth-round selection they acquired from the Denver Broncos (168th and 170th overall).
 The Vikings traded RB Darius Reynaud and QB Sage Rosenfels to the New York Giants in exchange for the Giants' fifth-round selection (150th overall) and a conditional 2012 seventh-round selection (which was not exercised).
 The Vikings were awarded two compensatory picks for the loss of free agents Artis Hicks and Chester Taylor.

Preseason

Schedule
The Vikings' preseason schedule was announced on April 12, 2011.

Game summaries

Week 1: at Tennessee Titans

Week 2: at Seattle Seahawks

Week 3: vs. Dallas Cowboys
{{Americanfootballbox
 |titlestyle=;text-align:center;
 |state=autocollapse
 |title=Preseason Week 3: Dallas Cowboys at Minnesota Vikings – Game summary
 |date=August 27
 |time=19:00
 |road=Cowboys
 |R1=3 |R2=14 |R3=3 |R4=3
 |home=Vikings
 |H1=7 |H2=3 |H3=7 |H4=0
 |stadium=Mall of America Field at Hubert H. Humphrey Metrodome, Minneapolis, Minnesota
 |attendance=62,800
 |weather=None (domed stadium)
 |referee=John Parry (132)
 |TV=KARE-11
 |TVAnnouncers=Ari Wolfe, Mike Mayock and Randy Shaver
 |reference=Recap, Game Book
 |scoring=
First quarter
MIN – Bernard Berrian 49-yard pass from Donovan McNabb (Ryan Longwell kick), 7:58. Vikings 7–0. Drive: 7 plays, 83 yards, 3:47.
DAL – Dan Bailey 37-yard field goal, 2:52. ''Vikings 7–3. Drive:Second quarterDAL – Alan Ball 20-yard return of blocked field goal (Shayne Graham kick), 14:36. Cowboys 10–7.
DAL – Felix Jones 5-yard run (Dan Bailey kick), 6:53. Cowboys 17–7. Drive: 11 plays, 77 yards, 4:10.
MIN – Ryan Longwell 44-yard field goal, 3:43. Cowboys 17–10. Drive: 7 plays, 16 yards, 3:10.Third quarterDAL – Dan Bailey 38-yard field goal, 8:05. Cowboys 20–10. Drive: 7 plays, 38 yards, 3:11.
MIN – Joe Webb 10-yard run (Ryan Longwell kick), 5:06. Cowboys 20–17. Drive: 7 plays, 81 yards, 2:59.Fourth quarterDAL – Dan Bailey 41-yard field goal, 1:07. Cowboys 23–17. Drive: 8 plays, 58 yards, 2:49.
 |stats=Top passersDAL – Tony Romo – 15/20, 141 yards
MIN – Donovan McNabb – 12/18, 164 yards, TDTop rushersDAL – DeMarco Murray – 7 rushes, 32 yards
MIN – Adrian Peterson – 14 rushes, 81 yardsTop receiversDAL – Dez Bryant – 5 rec, 67 yards
MIN – Bernard Berrian – 2 rec, 64 yards, TD
}}

Week 4: vs. Houston Texans

Regular season
Schedule

LEGEND
Team names in bold''' indicate Vikings' home games.

Game summaries

Week 1: at San Diego Chargers

Week 2: vs. Tampa Bay Buccaneers

Week 3: vs. Detroit Lions

Week 4: at Kansas City Chiefs

Week 5: vs. Arizona Cardinals

Week 6: at Chicago Bears

Week 7: vs. Green Bay Packers

Week 8: at Carolina Panthers

Week 10: at Green Bay Packers

After being swept by the Packers, the Vikings dropped to 2–7.

Week 11: vs. Oakland Raiders

Week 12: at Atlanta Falcons

Week 13: vs. Denver Broncos

Week 14: at Detroit Lions

Week 15: vs. New Orleans Saints

Week 16: at Washington Redskins

Week 17: vs. Chicago Bears

Standings

Statistics

Team leaders

 *Led the league and a new Vikings single-season record.

League rankings

Staff

Roster

Notes and references

Minnesota
Minnesota Vikings seasons
Minnesota